Santa Marcela, officially the Municipality of Santa Marcela, is a 4th class municipality in the province of Apayao, Philippines. According to the 2020 census, it has a population of 13,317 people.

Santa Marcela was created into an independent municipality on June 17, 1967, when several barrios were separated from Luna and Flora and constituted into the newly created town.

Geography

According to the Philippine Statistics Authority, the municipality has a land area of  constituting  of the  total area of Apayao.

Barangays
Santa Marcela is politically subdivided into 13 barangays. These barangays are headed by elected officials: Barangay Captain, Barangay Council, whose members are called Barangay Councilors. All are elected every three years.

Climate

Demographics

In the 2020 census, Santa Marcela had a population of 13,317.

Economy

Government
Santa Marcela, belonging to the lone congressional district of the province of Apayao, is governed by a mayor designated as its local chief executive and by a municipal council as its legislative body in accordance with the Local Government Code. The mayor, vice mayor, and the councilors are elected directly by the people through an election which is being held every three years.

Elected officials

References

External links

 [ Philippine Standard Geographic Code]

Municipalities of Apayao